John Frederick MacNeice (1866–1942), was born at Omey, Co. Galway, to a Protestant family which claimed descent from the kin of the early Irish saint MacNissi. Opting for the Church of Ireland ministry he served notably as rector of Carrickfergus, Co. Antrim and afterwards as bishop of Cashel, Emly, Waterford and Lismore (1931–1934) and until his death as bishop of Down, Connor and Dromore (1934–1942). MacNeice is well known for his symbolic opposition to the Partition of Ireland (accepted as a political reality): hence his refusal to allow the Union Flag to be laid on Carson's grave at his funeral in St Anne’s Cathedral, Belfast in 1935. MacNeice was twice married. One of his sons by his first marriage was the poet, Louis MacNeice.

References
Jon Stallworthy: Louis MacNeice, Faber and Faber, 1995
Christopher Fauske: 'Side by Side in a Small Country': Bishop John Frederick MacNeice and Ireland, Church of Ireland Historical Society, 2004
David Fitzpatrick: 'Solitary and Wild': Frederick MacNeice and the Salvation of Ireland, Lilliput Press, 2011.

1866 births
1942 deaths
Bishops of Cashel and Waterford
Bishops of Down, Connor and Dromore
20th-century Irish Anglican priests